Gudipudi is a village in Palnadu district of the Indian state of Andhra Pradesh. It is located in Sattenapalle mandal of Guntur revenue division.

Geography 
Gudipudi is located at coordinates 16°25'7"N   80°21'57"E geographically.

Demography 

Telugu is the local language. The village of Gudipudi covers an area of about 1782 hectares. As of 2011 India census, Gudipudi had a population of 5587, with 2783 men and 2804 women living in 1372 houses.

Government and politics 

Gudipudi gram panchayat is the local self-government of the village. The panchayat is divided into wards and each ward is represented by an elected ward member. These ward members are headed by a sarpanch. 
 The present sarpanch of the gram panchayat is Dasari Vijaya Raju, who got elected in the year 2013. The village forms a part of Andhra Pradesh Capital Region and is under the jurisdiction of APCRDA.

References 

Villages in Palnadu district